
The Lochinvar National Park lies south west of Lusaka in Zambia, on the south side of the Kafue River.The habitats the national park protects are a large portion of the southern Kafue Flats floodplain, including the Chunga Lagoon, and drier woodland dominated by termite mounds.

Lochinvar is also home to hot springs, echoing rocks, remains of a Neolithic settlement and an Iron Age village on Sebanzi Hill, also known for its caves, ancient baobab and wildlife.

The park's northern boundary is marked by the Kafue River. In the south there are wooded hills. The park's total area is 428 square kilometres.

The park is very similar to Blue Lagoon National Park on the other side of the Kafue on the northern flats.

A former ranch, the park was designated in 1972 and is known for its Kafue lechwe and birdlife, with over 400 species recorded. The other antelopes found here are blue wildebeest, kudu and oribi. The antelope and birds thrive in the absence of larger predators, which have been killed off by ranchers in the area. The southern area of the park, which is a stretch of woodland dominated by Acacia albida and Combretum trees, is spared from the flooding that occurs in other parts of the park. This drier area is home to species like the bushbuck, kudu, baboon, bushpig and vervet monkey. The marshes host a large number of waterfowl, including migratory species.

The old colonial-style farmhouse serves as the lodge for the park.

Lochinvar is the name of a loch in Galloway,  Scotland.

See also

 Wildlife of Zambia
 Gwisho Hot-Springs

References

External links
 Zambia Tourism - Lochinvar National Park

1972 establishments in Zambia
Geography of Southern Province, Zambia
Kafue River
National parks of Zambia
Protected areas established in 1972
Tourist attractions in Southern Province, Zambia